This is a list of transactions that have taken place during the offseason and the 2016–17 NBA season.

Retirements

Front office movements

Head coach changes
Off-season

General manager changes
Season

Player movements

Trades

Free agency

Free agency negotiation started on Friday, July 1, 2016. Players were allowed to sign starting on July 7, after the July Moratorium ended. The following players, who last played for an NBA team during the 2015–16 season, were scheduled to become free agents. All players became unrestricted free agents unless indicated otherwise. A restricted free agent's team has the right to keep the player by matching an offer sheet the player signs with another team. This free agency period was marked with some of the most infamous contracts handed out to players in league history.

* Player option
** Team option
*** Early termination option

Going to other American leagues

Going overseas

Released

Waived

(R) Retirements

Training camp cuts
All players listed did not make the final roster.

Draft

2016 NBA draft
The 2016 NBA draft was held on June 23, 2016 at the Barclays Center in Brooklyn.

First round

Second round

Previous years' draftees

Renounced draft rights

See also

Notes

References

Transactions
NBA transactions